Math rock is a style of progressive and indie rock with roots in bands such as King Crimson and Rush as well as 20th-century minimal music composers such as Steve Reich. It is characterized by complex, atypical rhythmic structures (including irregular stopping and starting), counterpoint, odd time signatures, and extended chords. It bears similarities to post-rock.

Characteristics 

Math rock is typified by its rhythmic complexity, seen as mathematical in character by listeners and critics.

As in traditional rock, the sound is most often dominated by guitars and drums. However, drums play a greater role in math rock in providing driving, complex rhythms. Math rock guitarists make use of tapping techniques and loop pedals to build on these rhythms, as illustrated by songs like those of "math rock supergroup" Battles.

Lyrics are generally not the focus of math rock; the voice is treated as just another instrument in the mix. Often, vocals are not overdubbed, and are positioned less prominently, as in the recording style of Steve Albini, or the Rolling Stones producer Jimmy Miller. Many of math rock's best-known groups are entirely instrumental such as Don Caballero or Hella.

The term began as a joke but has developed into the accepted name for the musical style. One advocate of this is Matt Sweeney, singer with Chavez, a group often linked to the math rock scene.  Despite this, not all critics see math rock as a serious sub-genre of rock.

A significant intersection exists between math rock and emo, exemplified by bands such as Tiny Moving Parts or American Football, whose sound has been described as "twinkly, mathy rock, a sound that became one of the defining traits of the emo scene throughout the 2000s".

Bands

Early 
The albums Red and Discipline by King Crimson, Spiderland by Slint are generally considered seminal influences on the development of math rock.  The Canadian punk rock group Nomeansno (founded in 1979 and inactive as of 2016) have been cited by music critics as a "secret influence" on math rock, predating much of the genre's development by more than a decade. An even more avant-garde group of the same era, Massacre, featured the guitarist Fred Frith and the bassist Bill Laswell. With some influence from the rapid-fire energy of punk, Massacre's influential music used complex rhythmic characteristics. Black Flag's 1984 album, My War, also included unusual polyrhythms.

Asian 
Math rock has a significant presence in Japan; the most prominent Japanese groups include Toe, Tricot, and Lite. Other Japanese groups which incorporate math rock in their music include Ling tosite Sigure, Zazen Boys and Mouse on the Keys while the Japanoise scene features bands such as Ruins, Zeni Geva, and Boredoms.

Taiwan has a very small indie music scene, of which Math rock is an emergent genre that is quickly gaining in popularity, with well-known math rock bands including Elephant Gym.

European 
The European math rock scene started in the late 90s to early 2000, including bands such as Adebisi Shank (Ireland), Kobong (Poland), The Redneck Manifesto (Ireland), Three Trapped Tigers and TTNG (United Kingdom) and Uzeda (Italy). Foals (England) was formed in 2005.

North American 
Bands from Washington, D.C. include The Dismemberment Plan, Shudder to Think, Hoover, Faraquet, 1.6 Band, Autoclave, later Jawbox, and Circus Lupus. Polvo of Chapel Hill, North Carolina is often considered one of the cornerstones of math rock, although the band has disavowed that categorization.

In California, math rock groups from San Diego include Upsilon Acrux, Drive Like Jehu, Antioch Arrow, Tristeza, No Knife, Heavy Vegetable, and Sleeping People. Northern California math rock bands included Tera Melos, Game Theory and The Loud Family, both of the latter led by Scott Miller, who was said to "tinker with pop the way a born mathematician tinkers with numbers". The origin of Game Theory's name is mathematical, suggesting a "nearly mathy" sound cited as "IQ rock."

21st century 

By the turn of the 21st century, most of the later generation bands such as Sweep the Leg Johnny had disbanded. Bands in the late 1990s and 2000s, such as TTNG and American Football, began combining math rock and emo, creating a much more vocally oriented sound.

In the mid-2000s, many math rock bands enjoyed renewed popularity. Slint and Chavez embarked on reunion tours, while Shellac toured and released their first album in seven years. Don Caballero reunited with a new lineup and released an album in 2006, while several of its original members joined new projects, such as the band Knot Feeder.

See also 

 List of math rock groups
 List of musical works in unusual time signatures
 Mathcore
 Music and mathematics
 Noise rock
 Post-hardcore
 Post-rock
 Progressive metal

Notes and references

Further reading

External links 

 
Alternative rock genres
Mathematics and culture
Post-hardcore